White Hart Lane is a London Overground station on the Lea Valley lines located in Tottenham of the London Borough of Haringey in North London. It is in Travelcard zone 3.

The station is close to Bruce Grove and Tottenham Hotspur Stadium, the home ground of Tottenham Hotspur Football Club.

History

White Hart Lane was originally a stop on the Stoke Newington & Edmonton Railway line (part of Great Eastern Railway) which opened on 22 July 1872. The station was named after the local road on which it is sited – White Hart Lane (the road probably acquired its name in the 17th century but part of it existed earlier as Apeland Street), and it was once the location of a spring called Bishop's Well. The area was semi-rural before the arrival of railway with some villas and other buildings along Tottenham High Road, and the opening of the station drew increasing population to the area, which then developed to become more urban. The line was extended to Enfield, and within a few years 4 trains per hour was running from Liverpool Street to Enfield, more at peak hours, with two reversing at White Hart Lane. It was also linked to Cheshunt in October 1891, initially with services that ran only between White Hart Lane and Cheshunt.  In addition to the passenger service, there were also freight facilities on the up side with a refuge siding on the opposite side until 1968.

The original station building built in 1872 is a two-storey brick structure. The White Hart Lane football stadium opened in 1899 and the station became a point of arrival for fans attending matches at the stadium. As attendance increased, wide exit doors were provided to cope with the 10,000-strong crowds that passed through the station to  the stadium on match days. At its busiest, train were running at intervals of under five minutes, the maximum possible with steam trains.

In 1957, a scheme was initiated to raise the railway bridge over the  adjoining road White Hart Lane by  so that double-decker buses may pass under. This required substantial alterations to the platforms and lifting of the tracks which was completed in 1958. The work was one of the schemes undertaken in preparation for the electrification of the line. In 1962, a new entrance was added at the station for football fans returning after matches.

In 1978, a fire caused some damage to old station, and a new ticket office was built to the north of the original Victorian building. The entrance frontage beside the road of White Hart Lane dates from this period. New staircases were also constructed on both sides of the exteriors of the platforms for passengers' access.

The Provisional IRA planted a small bomb at the station on 1 March 1992, which coincided with a League Cup semi-final match against Nottingham Forest at White Hart Lane.  The match was delayed while the device was made safe.

Today, the station and services that call are operated by London Overground, which took over from Abellio Greater Anglia in May 2015. At that time, the station was added to the Tube map.

Rebuilding

As part of the Northumberland Development Project to redevelop the White Hart Lane stadium and regenerate the area the station was also selected to be upgraded. This involved the building of a new ticket hall to the south of the original station building on Love Lane to create a better connection with Tottenham High Road, and an additional entrance on Penshurst Road as well as two lifts for step-free access to ease the bottlenecking of fans on match day. There is also additional new cycle parking. The rebuilding, which was undertaken by Taylor Woodrow Construction, was originally scheduled to start in autumn 2017 and finish in spring 2019 but was delayed. The new entrance to the station was opened on 26 August 2019.

Discussions were reported in 2019 regarding a proposal that the station could be renamed "Tottenham Hotspur".

Tottenham Hotspur matches
On days that see football matches at Tottenham Hotspur's ground nearby the station sees increased usage. A special timetable operates on match days, with trains arriving and departing every two to three minutes before and after the game.

Services

Trains are operated by London Overground.

The typical off-peak weekday service pattern from White Hart Lane is:

In peak hours there are additional services to Liverpool Street and Enfield Town.  More frequent services operate on match days.

Connections 
London Buses routes 149, 259, 279, 349, W3 and night route N279 serve the station.

References

Bibliography

External links

Railway stations in the London Borough of Haringey
Former Great Eastern Railway stations
Railway stations in Great Britain opened in 1872
Railway stations served by London Overground
Buildings and structures in Tottenham